Abraham Bockee (February 3, 1784 – June 1, 1865) was an American lawyer and politician from New York who served three terms in the  U.S. House of Representatives from 1829 to 1831, and from 1833 to 1837.

Biography
Born in Shekomeko, New York, Bockee attended the public schools and graduated from Union College in 1803. He studied law in Poughkeepsie, was admitted to the bar in 1806, and practiced in Poughkeepsie until 1815, when he returned to Shekomeko to engage in agricultural pursuits. He married Martha Oakley and they had six children, Catharine Jerusha, Mary, Jesse Oakley, Alexander Phoenix, Isaac Smith, and Phoenix.

Political career

State House 
Bockee was a Federalist member of the New York State Assembly (Dutchess Co.) in 1820.

Congress 
He was elected as a Jacksonian to the 21st United States Congress, holding office from March 4, 1829, to March 3, 1831. He was elected again to the 23rd and 24th United States Congresses, holding office from March 4, 1833, to March 3, 1837. He was Chairman of the Committee on Agriculture during the 23rd and 24th Congresses.

State Senate 
He was a member of the New York State Senate (2nd D.) from 1842 to 1845, sitting in the 65th, 66th, 67th and 68th New York State Legislatures. He was First Judge of the Dutchess County Court in 1846.

Death 
Bockee died on June 1, 1865, in Shekomeko, New York; and was buried on his estate there.

References

External links

1784 births
1865 deaths
Members of the New York State Assembly
New York (state) state senators
New York (state) state court judges
Union College (New York) alumni
People from North East, New York
New York (state) Federalists
Jacksonian members of the United States House of Representatives from New York (state)
19th-century American politicians
Members of the United States House of Representatives from New York (state)